Si Tú Te Vas (Spanish: "if you go") may refer to:

Music
Si Tú Te Vas (album), 2008 album by Los Temerarios

Songs
"Si Tú Te Vas" (Enrique Iglesias song), 1995 song
"Si Tú Te Vas", 1977 song by Camilo Sesto
"Si Tú Te Vas", 1985 song by Juan Luis Guerra y 440 from the album Mudanza y Acarreo, covered by Los Melódicos in 1989
"Si Tú Te Vas", 1996 song by Jennifer Peña
"Si Tú Te Vas", the Spanish version of the 2002 song "Don't Say Goodbye" by Paulina Rubio
"Si Tú Te Vas", 2008 song from the album Si Tú Te Vas (album), by Los Temerarios
"Si Tú Te Vas", 2009 song by Tierra Cali
"Si Tú Te Vas", 2009 song by Martina Stoessel from Tini
"Si Tú Te Vas", 2018 song by Ximena Sariñana from ¿Dónde Bailarán las Niñas?

See also
Si Te Vas (disambiguation)